Randazzo is a surname. Notable people with the surname include:

Filippo Randazzo, 18th-century Italian painter
Florencio Randazzo (born 1964), Argentine politician
Joe Randazzo, American comedian and editor of The Onion
Matthew Randazzo V (born 1984), American true crime writer and historian
Nino Randazzo (born 1932), Italian Australian politician
Teddy Randazzo (1935–2003), American pop songwriter